In 1965, the United States rapidly increased its military forces in South Vietnam, prompted by the realization that the South Vietnamese government was losing the Vietnam War as the communist-dominated Viet Cong (VC) gained influence over much of the population in rural areas of the country.  North Vietnam also rapidly increased its infiltration of men and supplies to combat South Vietnam and the U.S. The objective of the U.S. and South Vietnam was to prevent a communist take-over. North Vietnam and the VC sought to unite the two sections of the country.

Political instability and internal dissent continued to plague the government of South Vietnam, although in June General Nguyễn Văn Thiệu and Air Marshall Nguyễn Cao Kỳ took control of the country and remained in power for the remainder of the year. In the United States, a majority of Congress and the people supported U.S. participation in the war, although protests against the war became larger and more frequent, especially among college students.

The U.S. began bombing North Vietnam in March, in Operation Rolling Thunder. The U.S. Army and Marines began ground operations to ferret out and defeat the communist forces. U.S. Military Assistance Command Vietnam (MACV), commanded by General William Westmoreland adopted a strategy of attrition, employing U.S. superiority in firepower, technology, and mobility. The usual military tactic of the United States was search and destroy operations in which large U.S. and South Vietnamese units, supported by air and artillery, swept through an area to attempt to engage the communists in battle. The People's Army of Vietnam (PAVN) and the VC, by contrast, relied on hit-and-run operations and ambushes, avoiding set-piece battles except at their own initiative.

In November, the U.S. and PAVN met head-on for the first time in the Battle of Ia Drang. Both sides claimed victory. The U.S. inflicted heavy casualties on the PAVN, but the battle vindicated the conviction by North Vietnam that its military could slowly grind down the U.S.'s commitment to the war.

South Korea contributed an army division to South Vietnam, while Australia, New Zealand and other countries provided smaller numbers of soldiers. North Vietnam received military aid from the Soviet Union and China.

At year's end, President Lyndon Johnson declared a temporary halt to the bombing of North Vietnam and undertook a diplomatic initiative to seek negotiations with North Vietnam. North Vietnam, on its part, aimed to achieve a decisive military victory, but prepared also for an expanded war if the U.S. continued to escalate its involvement.

January
 1 January
The South Vietnamese security forces, including the Army of the Republic of Vietnam (ARVN), Regional and Popular Forces, Montagnard irregulars and National Police totaled 567,246 personnel. 23,310 U.S. military personnel were in South Vietnam.

The number of VC guerrillas and PAVN regulars in South Vietnam was a matter of much debate. One U.S. government estimate was that the VC consisted of 40,000 full-time fighters and 80,000 to 100,000 part-time guerrillas. The Department of Defense's fact book estimated that the VC numbered less than 200,000 plus 39,175 political cadre. These numbers presumably included thousands of PAVN soldiers and cadre infiltrated during the previous five years. The first PAVN units dispatched to South Vietnam, consisting of three regiments (about 5,000 men), had arrived in South Vietnam in late 1964. A junior-level Central Intelligence Agency (CIA) analyst, Samuel A. Adams, had just begun work estimating VC numbers; he would later conclude that MACV underestimated VC strength by about one-half.

Both North Vietnam and the United States would rapidly increase the number of their troops in South Vietnam during 1965.

The Battle of Binh Gia concluded as the PAVN/VC withdrew from the battlefield. In six days of fighting, the VC 9th Division had killed 201 South Vietnamese soldiers from the Airborne Division, Marine Division and Rangers and five American advisers.

 3 January
Senator Mike Mansfield, considered the U.S. Congress's most knowledgeable person about Vietnam, appeared on television and said that neutralization of South Vietnam through an agreement reached by negotiations between the U.S. and the communist powers might be the best solution to the war. Mansfield was one of several senators who had doubts about the course of U.S. policy in South Vietnam.

 6 January 
The Armed Forces Council made a show of officially renouncing all their power to Prime Minister Tran Van Huong, who was asked to organize elections.
They also agreed to appoint a civilian body and release those arrested in the December coup.

The U.S. Ambassador to South Vietnam General Maxwell Taylor summed up the situation in a telegram to the U.S. government in Washington. "We are faced here with a seriously deteriorating situation characterized by continued political turmoil, irresponsibility and division within the armed forces, lethargy in the pacification program, some anti-US feeling which could grow, signs of mounting terrorism by VC directly at US personnel and deepening discouragement and loss of morale throughout SVN. Unless these conditions are somehow changed and trends reversed, we are likely soon to face a number of unpleasant developments ranging from anti-American demonstrations, further civil disorders, and even political assassinations to the ultimate installation of a hostile govt which will ask us to leave while it seeks accommodation with the National Liberation Front and Hanoi."

Taylor opposed the introduction of U.S. ground units to help fight the VC (as proposed in frustration by President Johnson a few days earlier), endorsing instead a U.S. policy of graduated air attacks against the Ho Chi Minh trail, the supply line for the PAVN/VC itself.

 9 January
Huong and the South Vietnamese military again reiterated their commitment to civilian rule through an elected legislature and a new constitution, and that "all genuine patriots" would be "earnestly assembled" to collaborate in making a plan to defeat the communists. Khánh and Taylor were both signatories to this announcement.

14 January
Two U.S. jets were shot down over central Laos while bombing North Vietnamese supply lines.

15 January
The first two Women's Army Corps soldiers arrived in Saigon.

 20 January
While Buddhist protests against the government and the United States intensified, including the burning of a United States Information Service library in Huế, Ambassador Taylor met with a Buddhist leader. He said the Buddhists wanted peace and told Taylor that the leaders of South Vietnam were only interested in the benefits they could derive personally from American aid and would otherwise capitulate to the VC. The Buddhists had been protesting against the government of South Vietnam for the previous two years.

21 January
An ARVN air assault in Kien Hoa Province killed 46 VC and captured 61.

 26 January
In a speech, former Vice President Richard Nixon argued the U.S. military effort should be escalated to destroy communist supply lines and staging areas in Laos and North Vietnam. He said the U.S. must "either get out, surrender on the installment plan through neutralization, or... find a way to win."

 27 January
Amidst continuing political chaos in South Vietnam, General Nguyễn Khánh and the Armed Forces Council overthrew the civilian government of Trần Văn Hương in a bloodless coup, replacing Houng with civilian Nguyễn Xuân Oánh. Khánh, who had been Prime Minister during most of 1964, had been hovering in the background for some time, so the coup d'état was not a great surprise. Ambassador Taylor cabled Washington that Khánh had an alliance with the Buddhist Institute headed by Thích Trí Quang. Taylor said, "The most sinister aspect of this affair is the obvious danger that the Buddhist victory may be an important step toward the formation of a government which will eventually lead the country into negotiations with Hanoi and the National Liberation Front [VC]."

In response to the coup, National Security Council director McGeorge Bundy and Secretary of Defense Robert McNamara wrote a memo to President Johnson.  They gave the President two options: use American military power to defeat the insurgency, or negotiate thus attempting to "salvage what little can be preserved."  Bundy and McNamara favored the first option; Secretary of State Dean Rusk disagreed.  Johnson accepted the military option and sent a telegram to Ambassador Taylor in Saigon saying "the U.S. will spare no effort and no sacrifice in doing its full part to turn back the Communists in Vietnam." President Johnson had crossed the Rubicon.

27 January - 4 February
In Laos two coups took place. On 27 January General Phoumi Nosavan once again attempted to seize control of the government but was opposed by forces loyal to General Kouprasith Abhay. On 29 January Colonel Bounleut Saycocie independently mounted his own coup, but after a short term takeover of Vientiane's radio station and infrastructure his forces returned to Government control and were then used by Kouprasith to suppress Phoumi's coup.

February
6 February
The VC's Radio Liberation announced that the VC had shot two American prisoners of war as reprisals against the Vietnamese government, which had sentenced two VC to death.

 7 February

The VC attacked Camp Holloway near Pleiku killing eight Americans, wounding 128, destroying 10 U.S. aircraft and damaging a further 15. McGeorge Bundy (visiting South Vietnam) and General Westmoreland visited Pleiku that day. Bundy strongly recommended a reprisal attack against North Vietnam. Bundy reported to Johnson "The situation in Vietnam is deteriorating and without new U.S. action defeat appears inevitable--probably not in a matter of weeks or perhaps even months, but within the next year or so.... There is still time to turn it around, but not much."

In retaliation, President Johnson ordered Operation Flaming Dart: 49 retaliatory sorties by American and Republic of Vietnam Air Force (RVNAF) planes targeted PAVN bases near Đồng Hới; a second wave targeted VC logistics and communications near the Vietnamese Demilitarized Zone (DMZ). Among the pilots was Air Marshal Kỳ. Poor weather limited the damage caused by the strikes. One plane and its pilot were lost.

The Premier of the Soviet Union, Alexei Kosygin, was visiting Hanoi during the bombing. The Soviets were furious that an American attack was carried out while Kosygin was present and motivated to provide additional assistance to North Vietnam.

Bundy sent a memorandum to President Johnson advocating "a new US action" without which "defeat seems inevitable." Bundy said that "any negotiated US withdrawal today would mean surrender on the installment plan."

8 February

The USMC 1st LAAM Battalion based on Okinawa arrived at Da Nang Air Base and by 9 April its HAWK SAMs were operational at the base.

9 February
As bombing of North Vietnam continued, the People's Republic of China issued a statement that "We warn U.S. imperialism: You are overreaching yourselves in trying to extend the war with your small forces in Indochina, Southeast Asia, and the Far East. To be frank, we are waiting for you in battle array." On the same day, U.S. National Security Adviser McGeorge Bundy told Senator Mike Mansfield that the Johnson administration "was willing to run the risk of a war with China" if an invasion of North Vietnam was deemed necessary.

The U.S. Embassy in Moscow was attacked by a mob of about 3,000 Asian and Russian students who were protesting against the American bombing of North Vietnam. Two reporters, Adam Clymer of the Baltimore Sun and Bernard Ullman of the Agence-France news agency, were injured, and more than 200 windows in the building were shattered before Moscow police intervened.

The first twenty of 1,819 wives and children of South Vietnam-based American civilian and military personnel departed that nation, by order of President Johnson. The rest, including the dependents of Ambassador Taylor and General Westmoreland, departed over the next 15 days.

 10 February
VC sappers blew up a hotel used as an enlisted men's barracks in Qui Nhơn, killing 23 U.S. soldiers, two VC sappers and seven civilians.

11 February
In response to the Qui Nhơn attack President Johnson ordered Operation Flaming Dart II: 155 sorties and air strikes by U.S. and RVNAF aircraft.

In Hanoi, Soviet Premier Kosygin announced the Soviet Union had agreed to assist North Vietnam to defend itself from air attacks, by providing surface-to-air missiles (SAMs), jet fighter planes, technical support and advisers.

On his way back to Moscow from Hanoi, Kosygin stopped in Beijing for the second time in less than a month, and met with Mao Zedong, with a suggestion that the two nations help the United States to "find a way out of Vietnam" that would end the continuing war there; Mao's response was a warning that the Soviets should not use Vietnam as a bargaining issue in negotiations with the U.S., and refused to agree.

 13 February
President Johnson approved Operation Rolling Thunder, the Joint Chiefs of Staff plan for the sustained bombing of North Vietnam. Over an eight-week period, U.S. warplanes planned to bomb fixed targets and interdict military traffic along roads in southern North Vietnam. Johnson did not immediately launch Rolling Thunder.

 16 February

In the Vung Ro Bay Incident, an American pilot spotted a 100-ton North Vietnamese naval trawler unloading munitions on a beach at a remote bay on the coast of central South Vietnam. RVNAF aircraft sank the ship and the defenders and crew were later killed or captured after a firefight with South Vietnamese naval commandos. The incident spurred further United States Navy involvement in the Vietnam War.

The Armed Forces Council of South Vietnam appointed medical doctor Phan Huy Quát as Prime Minister.

Radio Moscow, the official English-language broadcasting station of the Soviet Union, warned that American bombing raids on North Vietnam could lead to a world war. "The flames of war starting in one place could easily spread to neighboring countries and, in the final count, embrace the whole world", the broadcast noted, and admonished that "responsibility for the dire consequences of such a policy rests with America."

 17 February 
On the United States Senate floor, Senator Frank Church said "The Saigon government is losing its war, not for lack of equipment, but for lack of internal cohesion" and the best solution would be the negotiation of a neutral South Vietnam. Church's speech was supported by several other prominent Democratic Party Senators, including George McGovern. Church's call for a neutral South Vietnam echoed similar statements by French President Charles de Gaulle, the Pope and the Secretary General of the United Nations. Former President Eisenhower and several Republicans supported Johnson's policy. Eisenhower advised Johnson not to negotiate from weakness.

 18 February
Influential columnist Walter Lippman in The Washington Post said escalation of the war would be a disaster. "For this country to involve itself in such a war in Asia would be an act of supreme folly."

 19 February
Colonel Phạm Ngọc Thảo and General Lam Van Phat mounted a coup d'état to overthrow General Khánh, head of the Armed Forces Council. The coup failed but the instability forced Khanh from power. North Vietnam later revealed that Thao was a communist agent. The coup collapsed when the U.S., in collaboration with Generals Nguyễn Chánh Thi and Cao Văn Viên, assembled units hostile to both Khanh and the current coup into a Capital Liberation Force. Saigon was recaptured "without a shot" the next day by loyal troops and Khanh was restored to power

21 February
The 15 generals comprising South Vietnam's High National Council — Nguyễn Văn Thiệu, Nguyen Van Cao and Nguyễn Cao Kỳ — voted to remove General Khánh from leadership as Prime Minister, and replaced him with a caretaker civilian premier, Trần Văn Hương.

 22 February
General Westmoreland requested that two battalions of United States Marines be assigned to protect Da Nang Air Base from the increasing threat of attacks by the VC.

 25 February
General Khánh departed South Vietnam. He was persuaded to leave by his fellow generals and by Colonel Wilson of MACV. Air Marshall Kỳ became the de facto leader of South Vietnam.

 26 February

The first South Korean troops arrived in South Vietnam in a brigade group known as Dove Force. These included engineers, a medical unit, military police, a navy LST, liaison staff, and other support personnel. Dove Force was deployed to Biên Hòa and helped build schools, roads and bridges. Medical teams are reported to have treated over 30,000 South Vietnamese civilians. The civilian operations in the early southern part of the campaign are reported to have had some success.

27 February
The U.S. Department of State issued a white paper to the press, Aggression From the North: The Record of North Viet-Nam's Campaign to Conquer South Viet-Nam, as a part of the U.S. government's effort to justify the escalation of the role of the U.S. in the war.  As a CIA employee and National Security Council staffmember would note later, the paper "proved to be a dismal disappointment... the only hard information we had about North Vietnamese participation and supplies and so forth came from information that was much too highly classified to include, and the only information that was of sufficiently low classification was pretty thin gruel."

28 February
The U.S. and South Vietnam announced that sustained bombing of North Vietnam would begin during the coming week. As a result of the announcement, North Vietnam's leaders ordered the evacuation of children and elderly residents from Hanoi and other major cities.

March
 1 March
Ambassador Taylor met with generals Thiệu and Trần Văn Minh in Saigon to request permission for the assignment of the Marines to Da Nang Air Base. The generals raised no objections, but asked that the Marines arrive "in the most inconspicuous way feasible."

In a memo to the Secretary of the Army, Stephen Ailes McNamara advised "I want it clearly understood that there are unlimited appropriations available for the financing of aid to Vietnam... under no circumstances is a lack of money to stand in the way of aid to that nation."

 2 March  
Operation Rolling Thunder was launched. One hundred and four U.S. fighter-bombers and 19 RVNAF aircraft hit targets in the largest U.S. bombing raid to date against North Vietnam. Five U.S. planes and one RVNAF plane were shot down. The operation was meant to last eight weeks, but instead lasted more than three years.

Previously, North Vietnam and its allies China and the Soviet Union had indicated a willingness for negotiations leading to the neutralization of South Vietnam and the withdrawal of the U.S. The bombing resulted in a hardened and less flexible communist position. North Vietnam shut down channels it had with Canada and France for exploring negotiations.

4 March
An angry mob assembled outside the U.S. Embassy in Moscow to protest the bombing of North Vietnam, before finally being driven away by police on horseback and soldiers. The next day, the Soviet Union formally apologized to the U.S. government and began replacement of 310 broken windows in the embassy building and the removal of stains from more than 200 inkpots that had been shattered against the walls.

 5 to 12 March
During a visit to Saigon Chief of Staff of the United States Army General Harold Keith Johnson met with senior officers and advised them that he had a "blank checque" from President Johnson to prosecute the war and asked then what they need to win.

 6 March
McGeorge Bundy wrote a memo to President Johnson saying: "Last night, Bob McNamara said for the first time what many others have thought for a long time - that the Pentagon and the military have been going at this thing the wrong way round from the very beginning: they have been concentrating on military results against guerrillas in the field, when they should have been concentrating on intense police control from the individual villager on up."

 8 March

1,400 Marines of the U.S. 9th Marine Expeditionary Brigade began to land on beaches near Da Nang. The arrival of the Marines heralded the direct involvement of American combat units in the war. The Marines had the responsibility of guarding the Da Nang Air Base but were ordered to "not, repeat not, engage in day-to-day actions against the Viet Cong." By the end of March the Marines at Da Nang numbered almost 5,000 Although there were 23,000 American military personnel in South Vietnam already, the deployment represented "the first body of Americans to go to the embattled southeast Asian nation as a fighting military unit."

 10 March
In Washington, Assistant Secretary of Defense John McNaughton sent a memo to National Security Adviser McGeorge Bundy outlining the U.S. objectives in South Vietnam in percentage terms:  "70% - to avoid a humiliating US defeat...; 20% - to keep SVN [South Vietnam]...territory from Chinese hands; 10% - to permit the people of SVN to enjoy a better, freer way of life.

The first drawings were held under Australia's new birthday lottery system of conscription. At the Department of Labor and National Service in Melbourne, Representative Dan Mackinnon drew marbles from a barrel as part of the "birthday ballot" until there were sufficient eligible men to meet the quota of 4,200 draftees. The results were kept secret, with a policy that "Although pressmen will be able to watch and photograph the drawing of the first marble they will not be allowed to see or photograph the number on it." Young men whose birthdays were selected were "balloted out" and would be notified within four weeks.

11 March - March 1973

 12 March
Vice President of the United States Hubert Humphrey had dinner with the Ambassador of the Soviet Union Anatoly Dobrynin in Washington. Dobrynin asked why the U.S. bombed North Vietnam while the USSR Premier Kosygin was visiting Hanoi. Dobrynin advised that the USSR was now committed to the support of North Vietnam, saying "We can't be a leader and stand by and ignore the bombing of the North Vietnamese."

16 March
82-year old Alice Herz stood at the corner of Grand River Avenue and Oakman Boulevard in Detroit, doused herself with two cans of flammable cleaning fluid, then set herself ablaze in protest against the war. She left a note that said, "I choose the illuminating death of a Buddhist to protest against a great country trying to wipe out a small country for no reason." Two bystanders smothered the flames, but she died of her burns 10 days later.

 17 March
The CIA and Defense Intelligence Agency issued an estimate of military strength in South Vietnam. The armed forces of South Vietnam numbered 567,000, of which 245,000 belonged to the ARVN and the remainder to the Regional and Popular Force militia. The VC was estimated to number between 50,000 and 60,000 regulars and 100,000 militia.

20 March
After hearing from General Johnson that it would take five years of fighting and 500,000 American troops to win the war, the Joint Chiefs of Staff recommended to McNamara to change the American mission from being "not simply to withstand the Viet Cong... but to gain effective operational superiority and assume the offensive", and that two additional divisions of combat troops be transferred to South Vietnam for that purpose. "To turn the tide of war," the memo said, "requires an objective of destroying the Viet Cong, not merely to keep pace with them, or slow their rate of advance."

22 March
Quoting Associated Press (AP) photographer Horst Faas and unidentified sources, AP reporter Peter Arnett broke the story that U.S. and South Vietnamese forces were using gas warfare in combat. Though he emphasized that these were "non-lethal" gases dispensed by helicopters and bombers, Arnett wrote that "one gas reportedly causes extreme nausea and vomiting, another loosens the bowels".  Hours after the story was revealed, a spokesman for the U.S. Department of Defense confirmed for afternoon papers that the story of the use of gas, but said that it was only being used by "South Vietnam's armed forces". Two days later, U.S. Secretary of State Rusk would hold a press conference to respond to the controversy, saying "We are not embarking upon gas warfare in Vietnam. There has been no policy decision to engage in gas warfare in Vietnam.  We are not talking about agents or weapons that are associated with gas warfare... We are not talking about gas that is prohibited by the Geneva Convention of 1925."

 24–25 March
The first Teach-in to protest the war was held at the University of Michigan, 3,500 people attended.

 25 March
China announced that it was ready to "send its personnel to fight together with the Vietnamese people to annihilate the American aggressors."

Republican senators John Sherman Cooper and Jacob Javits called on Johnson to support negotiations between North and South Vietnam without any preconditions.

 26 March
Westmoreland, said in a report to Washington that the South Vietnamese armed forces had "begun to show evidence of fragmentation and there is no longer an effective chain of command."

 29 March
In the face of disagreement among U.S. military leaders about where and how many U.S. combat troops should be stationed in Vietnam, McNamara, Westmoreland, Ambassador Taylor and the Joint Chiefs met in Washington. The Chiefs and Westmoreland wanted two U.S. combat divisions sent to Vietnam along with one combat division from the Republic of Korea. Taylor disagreed. McNamara didn't take a position. In meetings the next day, President Johnson agreed only to the assignment of two additional U.S. combat battalions to South Vietnam, but he approved an expansion and extension of the bombing of North Vietnam under Operation Rolling Thunder.

After a three-year testing period that had started with the beginning of Operation Ranch Hand on 29 December 1961, the United States moved into the second phase of the operation with the heavy use of defoliants and herbicides in combat zones.  Initially, four tactical herbicides, codenamed Purple, Pink, Green and Blue, were used, with Purple, a combination of 2,4-Dichlorophenoxyacetic acid (2,4-D) and 2,4,5-Trichlorophenoxyacetic acid (2,4,5-T) being the used the most.

30 March

The VC exploded a car bomb in front of the U.S. Embassy in Saigon killing 22 people, including 2 Americans.

The Soviet Union and the People's Republic of China signed an agreement allowing Soviet trains to travel through China to deliver economic and military aid to North Vietnam. However Mao Zedong rejected a request by Soviet leader Leonid Brezhnev to allow Soviets overflights through an air corridor for shipments.

The RAND Corporation publishes its first report on the war: Viet Cong Motivation and Morale in 1964 A Preliminary Report based on interviews with 145 VC POWs defectors and suspects between July and December 1964.

April
In North Vietnam President Ho Chi Minh decreed a new military service law. Enlistments were extended indefinitely for soldiers, previously discharged soldiers were recalled, and an increased number of young people were inducted into military service. During 1965, North Vietnam expanded the size of its army by 290,000 personnel and its self-defense militia from 1.4 million to 2.0 million.

1 April
President Johnson authorized a change in the U.S. Marines' mission in South Vietnam, a month after the first units had been sent to protect installations at Da Nang from attack. For the first time, American ground troops were scheduled to move into the surrounding area and to engage PAVN/VC forces in combat.

1st Logistical Command was activated in Saigon to assume logistics support for the U.S. Army in II, III and IV Corps.

3 April
One of the F-8Es was set on fire by cannons fired from a MiG-17 but was able to land safely at Da Nang. The VPAF claim to have shot down two F-8Es. In future years, 3 April would be a Vietnamese public holiday commemorated as "Air Force Day."

3 April - 11 November 1968
Operation Steel Tiger was a covert United States Air Force (USAF) 2nd Air Division, later Seventh Air Force and U.S. Navy Task Force 77 aerial interdiction effort targeted against the Ho Chi Minh Trail in southeastern Laos.

4 April
The USAF conducted its first airstrike on the Thanh Hóa Bridge, the raid failed to down the bridge and it would resist further attacks until finally being downed on 13 May 1972. Two USAF F-105 Thunderchief strike aircraft were shot down and both their pilots killed, the first aircraft lost in air-to-air combat by either side during the war. A USAF F-100 Super Sabre fighter escorting the strike aircraft scored the first probable USAF kill of the war shooting down a VPAF MiG-17.

5 April

A U.S. Navy RF-8 Crusader reconnaissance aircraft photographed an SA-2 Guideline surface-to-air missile (SAM) site under construction in North Vietnam for the first time.

5-7 April
Fighting in the Mekong Delta kills 276 VC and six U.S. advisers and helicopter crewmen.

 7 April 
President Johnson made a major televised speech at Johns Hopkins University. Johnson described the war as an attack by North Vietnam on South Vietnam. He proposed "unconditional discussions" to exchange views with interested parties in search of a peaceful solution, but offered no concessions. Johnson also proposed a massive program to develop the Mekong River basin which could include North Vietnam among the recipients of the Tennessee Valley Authority-type project. Ho Chi Minh responded that the United States must withdraw from South Vietnam as a condition for a peace agreement. The Johns Hopkins speech marked a change in American policy. Formerly, over a period of several years of escalating warfare in South Vietnam, the U.S. had refused to consider talking to the VC and North Vietnamese until the U.S. and South Vietnam had gained a military advantage.

Elements of the VC 2nd Regiment attacked the positions of the 2nd Vietnamese Marine Battalion at midnight. The Marines repulsed 10 attacks and the VC withdrew at dawn leaving 59 dead, 10 wounded and 71 weapons. Intelligence revealed that a further 70 VC dead and over 200 wounded were removed from the battlefield; VNMC losses were four killed.

 8 April
North Vietnamese Prime Minister Phạm Văn Đồng responded to President Johnson's proposal for peace negotiations by announcing North Vietnam's Four Points peace formula: withdrawal of all U.S. forces from South Vietnam, neutralization of both Vietnams pending reunification, adoption of the program of the National Liberation Front [VC] for internal affairs, and reunification without foreign interference.

A mutiny by 20 young officers ousted Admiral Chung Tấn Cang as commander of the Republic of Vietnam Navy in an action "that evidently had the government's blessing". The military junta governing South Vietnam did not order a response, and one U.S. official commented that Cang, an associate of recently ousted President Nguyen Khanh, "has been a thorn in our side", because of his lack of cooperation in moving military supplies.

Two U.S. Navy F-4B Phantom fighters flew into Chinese airspace and were tracked by radar flying over the Yulin Naval Base on Hainan Island, but departed before the Chinese military could respond to an alert.

 9 April
At a CINCPAC meeting in Hawaii, the planners recommended the deployment of two brigades to South Vietnam. One would be stationed at Biên Hòa near Saigon to protect Bien Hoa Air Base; the other would go to Nha Trang to prepare for the introduction of a full division of U.S. troops. Ambassador Taylor had not been present at the meeting and he protested that "Recent actions relating to the introduction of U.S. ground forces have tended to create an eagerness in some quarters to deploy forces into SVN which I find difficult to understand." Taylor opposed the introduction of American ground troops for offensive operations, believing they should be restricted to coastal "enclaves." General Westmoreland disagreed, believing that enclaves were "an inglorious, static use of U.S. forces....that would leave the decision of when and where to strike to the enemy."

Two groups of four U.S. Navy F-4Bs, flew over Hainan Island. This time, a squadron of four Jian-5 jet fighters from the People's Liberation Army Air Force (PLAAF) intercepted them, with instructions not to fire unless fired upon.

10-14 April
On 10 April 1965 Task Force Alpha of 2nd Battalion, 3rd Marines was landed by helicopter from Danang Air Base to secure Phu Bai airfield and the surrounding area. On 13 April a detachment of ten UH-34D helicopters from HMM-162 was established at Phu Bai. On 14 April Battalion Landing Team 3rd Battalion, 4th Marines replaced Task Force Alpha at Phu Bai.

14 April
The U.S. and South Vietnam began "Operation Fact Sheet", a psychological warfare aerial mission, dropping over two million notices on those cities in North Vietnam with military facilities. The paper leaflets carried different types of messages written in the Vietnamese language. Some of them warned civilians to stay away from the areas that were to be bombed, and others suggested that civilians "could end the bombings by turning against their government", or advocated the benefits of moving to South Vietnam. During April, May and June, nearly 25 million papers were dropped. "The leaflets had no effect on North Vietnamese strategy", an author would note later, "but they did result in a few civilians moving away from military facilities."

15 April
VC Le Dua aka Le Van Dau was executed by firing squad at Da Nang stadium for the attempted bombing of the Grand Hotel.

16 April
Life magazine published as its cover story the photo-essay "One ride with Yankee Papa 13" by Larry Burrows documenting a helicopter mission on 31 March.

 17 April
In Washington, D.C. about 20,000 people gathered to protest the war organized by the Students for a Democratic Society (SDS). This was the first large protest against the war in the United States. At the same time, a counter-protest of about 100 people took place across the street, and a group of students representing the University of Wisconsin presented National Security Adviser McGeorge Bundy with a petition of support for the war, signed by 6,000 faculty and students.

China rescinded the order to the PLAAF to not attack American war planes violating Chinese air space. Over the next three years, 12 American war planes and several reconnaissance planes were shot down over China.

 20 April
At a meeting of American military and political leaders in Honolulu, Ambassador Taylor successfully proposed that the U.S. adopt what he called the "enclave strategy" in its conduct of the war. Defense Secretary McNamara and Assistant Secretary John McNaughton, CIA analyst William Bundy, General Westmoreland, U.S. Navy Admiral U. S. Grant Sharp Jr. and the Joint Chiefs of Staff Chairman, General Earle Wheeler concurred in the proposal, which was adopted by President Johnson. Taylor's idea was to limit U.S. ground operations to within a  radius of important areas in important coastal areas, and with the ARVN to conduct counter-insurgency operations in the surrounding territory.  The strategy would prove unsuccessful, leading to Taylor's resignation and a switch to a "search and destroy" operation in June. In a memo to the President the next day, McNamara described the military consensus that "it would take more than six months, perhaps a year or two to...break the will of the DRV/VC [PAVN/VC] by denying them victory." On this date the U.S. had 33,000 U.S. military personnel in Vietnam and another 20,000 scheduled to be there.

22 April
Defense Secretary McNamara told reporters that he would not rule out the use of nuclear weapons in the war, as part of a press conference given under the condition that the reporters not attribute his remarks to him, nor quote him verbatim. Tom Wicker of The New York Times took notes and paraphrased the statement, in which McNamara said "We are not following a strategy that recognizes any sanctuary or any weapons restriction. But we would use nuclear weapons only after fully applying non-nuclear arsenal. In other words, if 100 planes couldn't take out a target... we would try 200 planes, and so on. But 'inhibitions' on using nuclear weapons are not overwhelming." Wicker's report noted that "High officials" in the Johnson administration "emphasize that it is 'inconceivable' that nuclear weapons would be used in the present circumstances of the war. They do not rule out the possibility that circumstances might arise in which nuclear weapons have to be used." Nikolai T. Fedorenko, the Soviet Ambassador to the United Nations, sharply criticized McNamara and the U.S. in a speech the day after the report, commenting that "See the statement made today by Mr. McNamara... The United States is not averse to utilizing — this time perhaps as tactical weapons - nuclear warheads against the people of an Asian country as they have done once before, covering themselves with indelible shame for centuries to come. Mr. McNamara clearly reserved the right to unleash nuclear war in Vietnam."

A Marine reconnaissance company was fired on by a VC unit, the Marines returned fire and killed one VC.

 23 April
Ambassador Taylor reported to Washington that Prime Minister Quat was reluctant to accept the assignment of more U.S. soldiers to South Vietnam.

USAF Lieutenant Colonel James Robinson Risner commander of the 67th Tactical Fighter Squadron is featured on the cover of Time magazine. On 15 September Risner's F-105 was shot down over North Vietnam and he was captured and held as a prisoner of war until 12 February 1973.

28 April
President Johnson met with FBI Director J. Edgar Hoover and noted that, according to U.S. intelligence reports, American protests against the war were part of a strategy of China, North Vietnam and the American members of the "New Left"; with the goal that "intensified antiwar agitation in the United States would eventually create a traumatic domestic crisis leading to a complete breakdown in law and order" and that "U.S. troops would have to be withdrawn from Vietnam in order to restore domestic tranquility."

Companies E and F, 2/3rd Marines participated in the first coordinated ground operation with ARVN forces.

29 April
Australian Prime Minister Robert Menzies informed the Parliament in Canberra that he was sending the 1st Battalion, Royal Australian Regiment (1 RAR) to fight in the war, at the request of the Premier of South Vietnam. The day before, after the news of the government's plans had been published to the press, Menzies cabled the Australian Embassy in Saigon to stress the urgent need for South Vietnam to actually send a request, and during Thursday, Ambassador H. D. Anderson and his staff had to speak to the Vietnamese Premier, Phan Huy Quát, to ask him to invite Australia to enter the war. The cable from Premier Quát was not received by Menzies until 5:36 p.m. two and a half hours before Menzies was scheduled to speak to Parliament.

Captain Charles Shelton was shot down and captured by the Pathet Lao. He would be listed as a prisoner of war by the United States Department of Defense until 20 September 1994 making him the last American classified as a prisoner from the war.

 30 April
The CIA warned in a memorandum that the introduction of U.S. ground forces into Vietnam might result in "constant danger that the war weary people of South Vietnam will let the U.S. assume an even greater share of the fighting.

 Late April 
The U.S. Army Chief of Staff General Johnson lunched with Vietnam expert and author Bernard Fall in Washington. Johnson said that, "As a result of my discussions with Dr. Fall, I conclude that I am the victim of appreciable misinformation concerning cliques, claques, and the variety of outlooks and objectives of the diverse elements that comprise the population of Vietnam."

In his search for more reliable information about Vietnam, in June, Johnson appointed a team of military officers to develop "new sources of action to be taken in South Vietnam by the United States and its allies, which, will, in conjunction with current actions, lead in due time to successful accomplishment of US aims and objectives." What came to be called "A Program for the Pacification and Long-Term Development of South Vietnam" (PROVN) would be completed on 1 March 1966.

May
3 May
An article in Newsweek magazine prompted the breaking of diplomatic relations by Cambodia with the United States. Prince Norodom Sihanouk cited a report about his mother, Queen Kossamak, that had accused her of involvement in "various money-making schemes".

 4 May
President Johnson requested an additional appropriation of $700 million for the war during the remainder of the fiscal year. The request was approved by Congress two days later. Johnson indicated that he might have to request additional funds.

 5 May

Soldiers from the 173rd Airborne Brigade arrived in South Vietnam. The brigade would be responsible for providing security to Bien Hoa Air Base and the port of Vung Tau, both near Saigon. This was the first combat unit from the U.S. Army to arrive in South Vietnam.

Forty male students at the University of California in Berkeley stood in front of the city's draft board office and burned their draft cards, introducing what would become a common form of antiwar protest and a refusal to join the war effort. The 40 UC students were among hundreds who marched to the draft board after a noon rally on the Berkeley campus. "While Berkeley police photographers snapped their photos," an Associated Press report noted, "the students squatted in a huddle like a football team and placed their burning cards in a small pile." Although future draft-card burnings would be made in opposition to the war, the initial protest was against the U.S. intervention in the Dominican Civil War.

 6 May
The Armed Forces Council of South Vietnam under General Thiệu dissolved itself leaving in nominal control of the country the civilian Prime Minister Quat.

III Marine Expeditionary Force established its headquarters at Da Nang Air Base.

 7 May
Marine forces land at Chu Lai to secure the area for construction of an air base.

9 May - 1 June

Construction began on what would become the Chu Lai Air Base in South Vietnam, as a unit of the U.S. Naval Mobile Construction Battalion, NMCB-10, began the task of putting in the first combat zone "Short Airfield for Tactical Support" (SATS).  The team would have a  runway in place within 23 days and the first airplanes A-4 Skyhawks from VMA-225 and VMA-311 would land on 1 June and launched their first airstrike later that day.

 10–15 May 
The town was recaptured by the ARVN with U.S. air support but the VC withdrew in good order and evaded pursuit by the ARVN.The battle resulted in 85 VC, 49 ARVN and five U.S. killed.

 13–18 May
President Johnson halted the bombing of North Vietnam under Operation Rolling Thunder in an attempt to induce the North Vietnamese to negotiate a peace agreement.  North Vietnam instead said the bombing halt was only "an effort to camouflage American intensification of the war."

 16 May
Ho Chi Minh met with Chinese leader Mao Zedong in China. Ho said that North Vietnam would "take the main burden of the war by themselves" but requested additional Chinese economic and military support. Mao agreed and they set the ground rules for Chinese assistance: North Vietnamese would fight the war with Chinese logistical help, but the Chinese would not intervene militarily unless the United States invaded North Vietnam. Chinese assistance to North Vietnam took three forms: engineers and laborers to build and maintain defense works, airfields and roads, anti-aircraft personnel to defend North Vietnam from air attacks, and military equipment. The total number of Chinese stationed in North Vietnam and dedicated to these tasks was about 160,000 with the first tranche arriving in May 1965.

Twenty-eight USAF airmen and eight RVNAF were killed in an accidental explosion at Bien Hoa Air Base. Thirteen airplanes were destroyed and 25 damaged.

 17 May
Presidential adviser and future Secretary of Defense Clark Clifford in a letter to President Johnson said, "I believe our ground forces in South Vietnam should be kept to a minimum, consistent with the protection of our installations and property in that country ... This could be a quagmire. It could turn into an open end commitment on our part that would take more and more ground troops, without a realistic hope of ultimate victory."

20 May
A few officers and around 40 civilians, predominantly Catholic, were arrested on charges of attempting to assassinate Quát and kidnap Kỳ among others. Several of the arrested were known supporters of Thảo and believed to be abetting him in evading the authorities.

23 May
Senator Ernest Gruening called for an investigation into the situation in South Vietnam and for U.S. forces to be withdrawn. Gruening and Wayne Morse were the only two senators to vote against the Gulf of Tonkin Resolution.

 26 May

27 May
New Zealand Prime Minister Keith Holyoake announced in Parliament that 120 troops from the 16th Field Regiment, Royal New Zealand Artillery become the first of that nation's troops to be committed to the war. "Nothing will give Australian soldiers more satisfaction than to be in company with troops from New Zealand”, Holyoake told the opening session of Parliament in Wellington.

 28 May-1 June    
The Battle of Ba Gia in Quảng Ngãi Province began when the VC 1st Regiment, 2nd Division ambushed the ARVN 1st Battalion, 51st Regiment 25th Division. The VC claim to have killed or wounded 915 ARVN and captured 270, while the ARVN claim to have lost 392 men and killed 556 VC. The battle highlighted the vulnerability of the ARVN as a military force against the flexible VC.

Late May - 17 August
The PAVN besieged Đức Cơ Camp which was defended by the 5th Special Forces Group Detachment A-215 and Civilian Irregular Defense Group program (CIDG) forces. On 3 August a force of ARVN Paratroopers with Major Norman Schwarzkopf as senior military adviser was sent to relieve the camp. The paratroopers took heavy casualties and a second, larger force was required to relieve them. That force too came into heavy contact on 5 August. Schwarzkopf and his group fought continuously for several days. On 17 August additional ARVN forces supported by two battalions of the 173rd Airborne Brigade arrived and broke the siege.

June

5 June
The U.S. Navy began a permanent presence by one aircraft carrier at Dixie Station off the coast of South Vietnam.

 7 June
General Westmoreland reported to the Joint Chiefs of Staff that the VC were stronger than ever and that ARVN was taking heavy casualties and suffering from a high rate of desertions and an unwillingness to take the offensive. Westmoreland said, "I see no course of action open to us except to reinforce our efforts in SVN South Vietnam with additional U.S. or third country forces as rapidly as is practical."  He identified U.S. units that could be assigned to South Vietnam that would bring U.S. military strength in the country up to 44 combat battalions.

8 June
A U.S. State Department spokesman, Robert J. McCloskey told a press conference "more or less offhandedly", that General Westmoreland had been given presidential authorization to commit American ground troops to combat in support of ARVN missions. McCloskey specifically said that "I'm sure it's been made clear... that American forces would be available for combat support together with Vietnamese forces as and when necessary." The White House issued a carefully worded denial the next day.

 9–13 June 
The battle resulted in 350+ VC, 416 ARVN and 7 U.S. killed and 12 missing.

 12 June

South Vietnam's President Phan Khắc Sửu and Prime Minister Phan Huy Quát announced their resignations, less than eight months after they had formed a civilian government that worked within the oversight of the military leaders. Major General Nguyễn Văn Thiệu was named as the President, chairing the "Supreme Military Council" and Vice Air Marshal Nguyễn Cao Kỳ became Prime Minister.

General Westmoreland asked the U.S. Department of Defense for increased authority to undertake offensive operations. He said, "We have reached the point in Vietnam where we cannot avoid the commitment to combat of U.S. ground troops." The Pentagon endorsed Westmoreland's request for additional soldiers which would bring total U.S. military personnel in Vietnam up to 117,000, plus 20,000 third-country troops, by November 1.

 16 June
Senator J. William Fulbright, Chairman of the Senate Committee on Foreign Relations said on national television that the U.S. should negotiate directly with North Vietnam and make "major concessions" to end the war. Fulbright's statement was criticized by prominent Republicans; former Vice President Nixon said that negotiations "would be surrender on the installment plan."

Secretary of Defense McNamara announced that 22,000 additional troops were being sent to South Vietnam, while conceding that the war was going unfavorably for the U.S.

17 June
In all, four MiGs were downed on that day by the U.S.

 18 June 
Under Secretary of State George Ball wrote a memo to President Johnson stating, "Ever since 1961 - the beginning of our deep involvement in Vietnam - we have met successive disappointments. We have tended to underestimate the strength and staying power of the enemy. We have tended to overestimate the effectiveness of our sophisticated weapons under jungle conditions. We have watched the progressive loss of territory to Viet Cong control. We have been unable to bring about the creation of a stable political base in Saigon." Ball advised caution in expanding the U.S. military commitment to South Vietnam.

Under Operation Arc Light, B-52 aircraft were used for the first time in the Vietnam War. Flying out of Andersen Air Force Base, Guam, 27 B-52s dropped 750- and 1,000-pound bombs on a VC stronghold. Two B-52s were lost in a mid-air collision. An after-action survey found little evidence of VC casualties.

 19 June
Air Marshall Kỳ was appointed by the military junta as Prime Minister. With Thiệu as president and Kỳ as Prime Minister the revolving door of rulers that had prevailed in South Vietnam since the overthrow of Ngô Đình Diệm in November 1963 ended.

 20 June
After being ambushed while in support of a rescue operation, A-1 Skyraider pilots Clinton Johnson and Charles Hartman shoot down a VPAF MiG-17 with their 20 mm M3 cannons. This is the first confirmed air-to-air gun kill of the war.

 22 June
The South Vietnamese publicly executed VC Tram Van Dong in Saigon for terrorism.

23 June
The Soviet Union rejected a proposal by British Prime Minister Harold Wilson to come to Moscow, along with the leaders of three other British Commonwealth states (the United Kingdom, Ghana, Nigeria, and Trinidad and Tobago), on a peace mission to end the war. Denying that the Soviet Union would have any influence over the Communist regime in North Vietnam, Soviet Premier Alexei Kosygin said that the U.S.S.R. "has not been authorized by anybody to conduct talks on a settlement in Viet Nam and the Soviet Government does not intend to conduct such negotiations."

 24 June
General Westmoreland advised Washington that he needed more soldiers than those previously approved and proposed that the U.S. bomb the railroad from North Vietnam to China, mine Haiphong harbor, and carry out B-52 strikes.

In retaliation for the execution of Tram Van Dong, the VC executed Sergeant Harold G. Bennett who had been captured on 29 December in the Battle of Binh Gia.

25 June
The VC planted two bombs in central Saigon, the first on the My Canh Café floating restaurant and second on a tobacco stall to injure the first responders. The two bombs killed 27 Vietnamese, 12 Americans, two Filipinos, one Frenchman, one German and wounded 80.

26 June
General Westmoreland was granted authority by the Department of Defense "to commit U.S. ground forces anywhere in the country when, in his judgement, they were needed to strengthen South Vietnamese forces."

 28–30 June
A battalion of the 173rd Airborne Brigade undertook the first major U.S.-led search and destroy mission of the war. The assault began with an artillery barrage; it located very few VC. An observation of an Australian on the operation was: "Our patrols do not fire off ammo or shoot up flares like the Yanks - they listen and move quietly, we haven't fired a shot or sent up a flare yet. The Americans think we are mad. It seems to me though, that all they're doing is letting the Viet Cong know where they are. I guess we have a bit to teach them." The Australians had experience in jungle warfare in the Malayan Emergency.

July
 1 July
Undersecretary of State Ball dissented from the buildup of American forces in South Vietnam. He wrote President Johnson that "The Viet Cong - while supported and guided from the North - is largely an indigenous movement" and that "although we have emphasized its Cold War aspects, the conflict in South Vietnam is essentially a civil war within that country." Ball's view conflicted with the official view that the insurgency in South Vietnam had been created and was sustained by North Vietnam.

Australia began training its first draftees for the war, bringing up the first of 63,790 conscripts who would have two years full-time service in the Australian Regular Army, followed by further service in the army reserves. In all, 804,286 young men who were 20 years old at the time that the draft reactivated, or turned 20 during the Vietnam era, registered for National Service.

A PAVN/VC mortar and sapper attack on Da Nang Air Base destroyed one F-102 and two C-130s and damaged a further two F-102s and one C-130.

The Special Landing Force comprising 3rd Battalion, 7th Marines and HMM-163 landed at Qui Nhơn to secure the area. They would be replaced by the 2nd Battalion, 7th Marines on 8 July.

4 July

6 July

The Soviet Union's Council of Ministers approved sending 2,500 army instructors to North Vietnam, to train North Vietnamese troops on how to use surface-to-air missiles against American airplanes.

 6–9 July
After B-52 strikes, the U.S. 173rd Airborne Brigade began another sweep through War Zone D with 2,500 men and ARVN and Australian participation. The allies claimed to have inflicted 100 VC casualties.

7 July
Former Olympian Lieutenant Ronald Zinn commanding a platoon of B Company, 2nd Battalion, 503rd Infantry Regiment was killed in action in War Zone D.

 8 July
Maxwell Taylor resigned as U.S. Ambassador to South Vietnam. Taylor had opposed the introduction of U.S. ground troops into South Vietnam, proposing instead an intensified air campaign against North Vietnam. Taylor would be replaced by Henry Cabot Lodge, Jr., who returned to Saigon for his second stint as ambassador.

The Vietnam Service Medal was established by Executive Order 11231 for all members of the armed services who served in the Vietnam War.

9 July
The VC attacked the Junk Force base on Ky Hoa Island, Marine units were sent to help repel the assault. 16 Junk Force sailors and two U.S. Navy advisers were killed in the initial attack and three Marines were killed in clearing the VC.

 10 July 
The New York Times reported that the 173rd Airborne suffered 10 killed and 42 wounded on its sweep through War Zone D, and that its estimates of VC casualties were inflated. The newspaper reported that the U.S. had begun "to accept aerial estimates of enemy casualties. The command has also begun to calculate probable damage inflicted on the Viet Cong despite the absence of bodies or weapons."

Two USAF F-4C Phantom fighters of the 45th Tactical Fighter Squadron shot down two VPAF MiG-17 fighters, scoring the first confirmed USAF jet victories of the war.

 12 July
The 2nd Brigade of the U.S. 1st Infantry Division began to arrive in South Vietnam. The brigade was initially responsible for providing security for Bien Hoa Air Base.

13 July
U.S. Army Sergeant First Class Isaac Camancho became the first U.S. prisoner of war to successfully escape from a VC prison camp. Four days earlier, Camancho had managed to pry loose a bar on a bamboo cage where he had been kept at night, after having been captured 19 months earlier on 24 November 1963.

15 July
The first New Zealand Army combat unit, 161 Battery, Royal New Zealand Artillery arrived at Bien Hoa Air Base.

 16 July 
Secretary of Defense McNamara, visiting South Vietnam, was briefed by General Westmoreland who said that U.S. airstrikes had not succeeded in halting the flow of military supplies down the Ho Chi Minh trail. To defeat the VC, now reinforced by the PAVN, would require another large influx of U.S. soldiers amounting to 57 battalions plus helicopter companies and support units. Westmoreland said he planned to reverse the deteriorating military situation by the end of 1965, take the offensive in 1966, and destroy the VC and capture their strongholds by the end of 1967.

Three months after a commitment by China's President Liu Shaoqi to provide Chinese pilots to fight in North Vietnam, the Chinese General Staff notified North Vietnam's Defense Ministry that "the time was not appropriate" to supply the assistance.

Thao was reported dead in unclear circumstances; an official report claimed that he died of injuries while on a helicopter en route to Saigon, after being captured north of the city. However, it is generally assumed that he was murdered or tortured to death on the orders of some military officials.

 20 July
McNamara returned to Washington and recommended to President Johnson that the number of U.S. troops in South Vietnam be increased to 175,000. He recommended also that 235,000 soldiers in the Reserve and National Guard be activated and that the number of U.S. military personnel be increased by 375,000 and that air strikes against North Vietnam be increased from 2,500 to 4,000 per month.

On the 11th anniversary of the signing of the Geneva Accords ending the First Indochina War, Ho Chi Minh said that the North Vietnamese and the VC will fight for 20 years or more to achieve victory and unification of the two Vietnams.

Police in Saigon foiled a plot to assassinate outgoing U.S. Ambassador Taylor, 15 minutes before he was scheduled to enter a stadium for South Vietnam's "National Unity Day for the Liberation of North Viet Nam" rally. VC members had placed a shrapnel-loaded bomb at a cemetery across the street from the entrance that Taylor was to use.

20–1 July
Two VC battalions attacked Bù Đốp Camp. At daybreak three CIDG companies arrived from Camp Bù Gia Mập securing the camp. VC losses were 161 killed.

 21 July
President Johnson convened his advisers in a meeting of the 15 member National Security Council at the White House, prior to making a decision about the direction that the United States should take in fighting the war. During the morning session, George Ball, the United States Under Secretary of State strongly argued against the recommendation by Secretary of Defense McNamara to increase the number of American troops in South Vietnam. According to minutes of that day's meeting that would be released years later, Ball urged that the U.S. should "cut its losses" and allow the South Vietnamese government to "do what seems natural to it, let it fall apart" and, with the rest of the advisers against him, closed with the prophetic statement that South Vietnam would ultimately lose to the VC guerrillas, regardless of McNamara's plans to commit 175,000 additional troops, that the U.S. would not get out with a victory, and that "we'll double our bet and get lost in the rice paddies." In the course of the discussion, General Wallace M. Greene, Jr. estimated that winning the war would take 5 years and 500,000 American soldiers. He said that he believed the American people would back such a commitment. Johnson was skeptical that Americans would support such a large commitment and opted instead for a gradual buildup of American forces and escalation of the war as recommended by General Westmoreland.

24 July
The pilot, Captain Richard P. Keirn ejected successfully from his stricken aircraft and was captured. His bombardier/navigator Captain Roscoe H. Fobair failed to eject and was killed, his remains were recovered in 2001. 24 July would be celebrated in North Vietnam as "Missile Day".

 27 July 
In a meeting with President Johnson most Congressional leaders of both parties agreed with his plan to increase U.S. military forces in South Vietnam. The exception was Senator Mike Mansfield, while publicly supporting the President said at the meeting, said, "we are going deeper into a war in which even a total victory would, in the end, be a loss to the nation." Mansfield proposed negotiations to end the war.

U.S. aircraft struck a surface-to-air missile installation for the first time, attacking an SA-2 site at Suối Hai, Hà Tây Province, North Vietnam. Operation Spring High took off with 46 F-105 fighter-bombers and 58 other supporting aircraft to bomb the sites, losing six planes in the process and destroying only one of the two targets, designated as "Site 6". Afterward, "bomb damage assessment photos disclosed that there was a dummy missile in Site 6, placed there as a trap, and that Site 7 was empty."

 28 July
In a nationally televised speech, President Johnson announced his decision to send an additional 50,000 U.S. troops to South Vietnam, increasing the number of personnel there by two-thirds and to bring the commitment to 125,000. Johnson also said that the monthly draft call would more than double, to more than 1,000 new young men per day (from 17,000 to 35,000) for enlistment and training in the U.S. Armed Forces, but he declined to activate the Reserve and National Guard. Johnson timed the speech for the noon hour in Washington, when there were fewer television viewers.

 29 July
A brigade of the U.S. 101st Airborne Division arrived at Cam Ranh Bay and set up its base camp there.

August

Sixty-one percent of Americans responded "no" to the following question by the Gallup Poll, "Do you think the U.S. made a mistake sending troops to fight in Vietnam?"

1 August
General Lo Jui-ching, the Chief of Joint Staff of the armed forces of the People's Republic of China, declared on Radio Peking that the Chinese were ready to fight the United States again, as they had in the Korean War. Comparing Johnson to Adolf Hitler, Benito Mussolini and Hideki Tojo, General Lo said of the Americans that "If they lose all sense of reality in their lust for gain and persist in underestimating the strength and determination of the Chinese people, impose a war on us, and compel us to accept the challenge, the Chinese people and the Chinese People's Liberation Army, long well prepared and standing in battle array, not only will stay with you without fail to the end, but invite you to come in large numbers, the more the better.

 3 August
After coming under VC sniper fire, U.S. Marines burned down the South Vietnamese village of Cam Ne, "using flame throwers, cigarette lighters and bulldozers" to set fire to 150 houses made up of straw, thatch, and bamboo and bulldozing homes made of sturdier materials. Major General Lewis W. Walt, the commander of the 3rd Marine Division, said in a statement that "the civilians had been urged in advance by helicopter loudspeakers to go to open fields where they would be safe" before their homes were burned down. The Marines were accompanied by CBS reporter Morley Safer and a cameraman, and while the newspaper reports of the deliberate destruction of homes had little impact, American TV viewers were shocked when they saw film of the attack on the CBS Evening News, and President Johnson was infuriated by the CBS decision to show the war in an unfavorable light.

3–17 August
On 8 August the South Vietnamese Marines Task Force Alpha and an ARVN armored task force departed Pleiku on 8 August to relieve the garrison. On 9 August they came into heavy contact with a PAVN battalion dug in astride Route 19. The South Vietnamese attacked and dislodged the PAVN, only to have the rear of the column attacked by another reinforced PAVN battalion. Battered by air strikes all night long, the PAVN 32nd Regiment, launched a final attack at dawn and then withdrew from the battlefield. On 10 August the South Vietnamese moved into Đức Cơ and broke the siege. The South Vietnamese infantry, with the support of U.S. and RVNAF air strikes, claimed to have killed over 400 PAVN and captured 71 weapons. VNMC losses were 28 killed and 3 missing. General Westmoreland sent the 173rd Airborne Brigade to Pleiku and the brigade opened the highway from Pleiku to Duc Co.

 5 August
The VC attacked the Esso petroleum storage facility in Liên Chiểu District near Da Nang, destroying 40 percent of the facility and almost 2 million gallons of fuel.

Former General and Ambassador Maxwell Taylor, now an adviser to President Johnson, told the President: "By the end of 1965, the North Vietnamese offensive will be bloodied and defeated without having achieved major gains."  North Vietnam would be forced to change its strategy.

Gerald R. Ford, a Congressman from Michigan and the leader of the Republican minority in the House of Representatives, urged President Johnson to ask Congress to declare war on North Vietnam, so that the increasing commitment of American servicemen could be debated. "It would be the honest thing to do under the circumstances, considering our present commitment."

6 August
After its pilots ejected safely, a battle-damaged USAF B-57 bomber and its payload of 16 armed 250-pound bombs crashed in a residential area of Nha Trang, killing at least 12 people and injuring 75 others.

12 August
Lieutenant (j.g.)

15 August
The VC attacked the National Police headquarters in Saigon killing two guards and exploding a bomb in the building before making their escape. The VC claim to have killed 165 police in the attack.

 18–24 August

Operation Starlite was the first offensive military action conducted by the U.S. Marines during the war and the first purely American operation. The operation resulted in 614 VC killed and 42 captured and 45 Marines killed. General William E. DePuy at a later briefing said that the VC "maneuvered in the jungle, maintained tactical integrity, withdrew their wounded, lost practically no weapons, and did a first class job" and that "we'd be proud of American troops...who did as well."

22 August to 2 October
Operation Highland was a clearing operation around An Khê conducted by the 1st Brigade, 101st Airborne Division to secure the area for the arrival of the 1st Cavalry Division. The operation resulted in 692 PAVN/VC and 21 U.S. killed.

24 August
A U.S. Marines C-130 Hercules plunged into Yau Tong Bay shortly after takeoff from Hong Kong's Kai Tak Airport killing 58 of the 71 U.S. military personnel onboard who had been on R&R and were returning to South Vietnam.

26 August
President Johnson signed an Executive Order removing a marriage exemption from the draft, although married fathers between the ages of 19 to 26 were still exempt. Americans who got married before midnight on the 26th would remain exempt from conscription into military service. Hundreds of men drove to Nevada in order to get married without a waiting period and would find out four days later that they had only deferred eligibility for four months; General Lewis B. Hershey announced on 30 August that all married, childless men (aged 19 to 26) would be eligible for the draft beginning in January, 1966.

28 August
A VC attack on Cần Thơ is repulsed with the VC losing more than 50 killed.

29 August
The 1st Battalion, 9th Marines operating south of the Marble Mountains engaged a VC company killing 12 VC and capturing 12. Later intelligence revealed that the VC had actually lost 30 killed.

31 August
Johnson signs into a law a bill that criminalizes the destruction or defacing of a draft card, with penalties of a $10,000 fine and/or five years in prison.

September
1 September
China lodged a protest with the United Kingdom for allowing American troops to visit Hong Kong while on R&R. The Chinese, who were obligated under a 99-year lease to allow the British to use the area as a colony until 1997, likened the recreational use to the placement of an American military base on the Chinese mainland. The diplomatic note was delivered in Beijing to British Chargé d'Affaires K. M. Wilford, who was summoned to the Chinese Foreign Ministry by Hsieh Li, the Director of the Ministry's Department for Western European affairs.

The U.S. Marine Corps announced that it was cutting the amount of training of new recruits from 12 weeks of boot camp to only eight, in response to the sudden increase in combat troops assigned to the war. "The aim is to process 30,000 additional men," a report noted, "without adding to present marine facilities or increasing the staff of instructors," effectively educating 50% more U.S. Marines each year.

5-7 September
During Operation Stomp, the 2/7th Marines used what it described as tear gas to force hidden VC guerrillas into the open in the South Vietnamese village of Vinh Quang in the Binh Dinh Province. The North Vietnamese branch of the International Red Cross, however, said that the 48 canisters were of a high concentration of phenacyl chloride or CN gas and that 35 civilians had been killed. USMC Lieutenant Colonel Leon N. Utter was investigated but cleared of wrongdoing. The operation resulted in 26 VC killed and three captured.

 6 September
The New York Times reported that ex-Vice President Richard Nixon said at a press conference that 125,000 American troops and an expanded bombing campaign would be sufficient to achieve victory in South Vietnam.

7-10 September

Operation Piranha was an assault by the U.S. 7th Marine Regiment, the ARVN 2nd Battalion, 4th Regiment, 2nd Division and the 3rd Vietnamese Marine Battalion on the VC stronghold on the Batangan Peninsula, Quảng Ngãi Province. The operation resulted in 178 VC, two U.S. and five South Vietnamese killed.

 11 September
The U.S. 1st Cavalry Division (Airmobile) began to arrive in South Vietnam at Qui Nhơn. The division was the first full U.S. Army division to be deployed to South Vietnam and relied on helicopters to transport its combat units to and from operational areas.

 13 September 
Columnist Joseph Alsop writing in The Washington Post said that, with the U.S. military build-up in South Vietnam, "at last there is light at the end of the tunnel."

14 September
Sergeant Alistair Don and Bombardier Robert White become the first two New Zealand soldiers killed in the war when their Land Rover is hit by a command detonated mine on Route 13.

16 September
An Air Vietnam DC-3 was shot down 11 km northeast of Quảng Ngãi killing all 39 on board.

 18 September
In Operation Gibraltar, 224 soldiers of the 2nd Battalion, 502nd Infantry Regiment, 101st Airborne Division landed by helicopter near An Khê, in the Central Highlands area where two VC battalions were located. The VC attacked and killed 13 Americans. Air strikes forced the VC to retreat, with losses estimated by the U.S. at between 226 and 257. General Westmoreland called the operation "a great victory."  Others, including Col. David H. Hackworth, considered the battle "not... a great victory."

 20 September
Six U.S. warplanes were shot down over North and South Vietnam.

Two People's Liberation Army Air Force Shenyang J-6 fighters shot down a USAF F-104C Starfighter #56-883 and captured its pilot, USAF Captain Philip E. Smith, when due to equipment failure and incorrect navigational commands he strayed into Chinese airspace over Hainan. Smith would spend more than seven years in solitary confinement in a Chinese prison until being released at Hong Kong on 15 March 1973.

 22 September
General Westmoreland requested 35,000 additional U.S. troops, which would bring the total military personnel authorized in South Vietnam to 210,000. President Johnson and Secretary of Defense McNamara set a limit of the total number of U.S. soldiers of 195,000.

The South Korean 2nd Marine Brigade arrived in South Vietnam and was deployed just outside Tuy Hoa.

26 September
U.S. Army Captain Humbert Roque "Rocky" Versace, 28, and U.S. Army Master Sergeant Kenneth M. Roraback, 33, were executed by the VC. According to a broadcast by Radio Hanoi, the two men, both of whom had been held prisoner since 1963, were killed in reprisal for the execution of three VC in Da Nang on the 23rd. Versace would be posthumously awarded the Medal of Honor on 8 July 2002.

 30 September - 1 October
General Suharto seized power in Indonesia ostensibly in response to an attempted coup by the Communist Party of Indonesia. An anti-communist purge followed and Suharto consolidated power with U.S. support and so "stabilising" the Indonesian "domino".

October
October
The "Fish" Cheer/I-Feel-Like-I'm-Fixin'-to-Die Rag is first released by Country Joe and the Fish, it would become one of the most recognized protest songs against the war.

October - June 1967

Project Skoshi Tiger was the combat testing of 12 F-5A/B Freedom Fighters by the USAF 4503rd Tactical Fighter Squadron. In June 1967 the surviving aircraft were transferred to the RVNAF to form their first jet squadron, the 522nd Fighter Squadron.

4 October
One of two planted bombs exploded at the Cong Boa National Sports Stadium, killing eleven Vietnamese, including four children and wounding 42 persons.

5 October
A bomb went off, apparently prematurely, in a taxi on a main street in downtown Saigon, killing two Vietnamese and wounding ten others.

9-13 October 
The 173rd Airborne Brigade conducted a sweep in the Iron Triangle killing 81 VC and capturing 79 for the loss of eight U.S. killed.

12 October
Senator John C. Stennis said that it might be necessary for U.S. troops to remain in South Vietnam for 15 years to ensure security.

 15 October
David Miller "a Catholic pacifist" burnt his draft card during an anti-war rally in New York City organized by the Catholic Worker Movement. On 18 October he was arrested by the FBI under the new federal law that made defacement of a selective service information card punishable as a crime and later served 22 months in prison.

 16 October
Protests against the war took place in Europe and in about 40 U.S. cities. The organization coordinating the U.S. demonstrations was called the National Coordinating Committee to End the War in Vietnam.

17 October
The first successful American attack on a North Vietnamese SAM site was accomplished when four A-4 Skyhawks struck a site near Kép Air Base northeast of Hanoi.

18 October
In the first Shining Brass mission against the Ho Chi Minh Trail in Laos an RVNAF CH-34 and an O-1 collided and disappeared killing all four on the aircraft, including Captain Larry Thorne.

18-20 October

 19–25 October

The Siege of Plei Me was a series of assaults by the PAVN on a CIDG camp manned by U.S. and ARVN special forces and rangers and 400 Montagnard allies.  U.S. airstrikes and a relief force lifted the siege. The siege resulted in 326 PAVN killed and a further 850 estimated killed in the siege and pursuit, 14 CIDG and three U.S. killed.

24 October to 26 November
Operation All The Way was a 1st Cavalry Division operation to pursue the PAVN retreating from Plei Me. 216 PAVN were killed and 138 captured, U.S. losses were 57 killed.

26 October
Two Marine F-4B Phantoms returning to Da Nang Air Base crashed into the side of Monkey Mountain killing all four crewmen.

 27 October
A CIA intelligence estimate said that "Hanoi continues to asset its determination to press on with the war in South Vietnam despite the continuing attrition of the air war and the increase of US troops in the South."

The South Korean Capital Division arrived in South Vietnam and was deployed outside of Qui Nhơn.

27/8 October

Approximately 90 VC attacked Marble Mountain Air Facility near Da Nang under the cover of 60 mm mortar fire using four demolition teams armed with Bangalore torpedoes and hand grenades. They were able to destroy 19 aircraft and damage another 35. VMO-2 took the brunt of the attack with 13 of its UH-1E Hueys destroyed. The attack killed two Marines and one Navy Corpsman with another 91 wounded. Seventeen Viet Cong were killed during the battle and four wounded VC were captured.

The VC penetrated Chu Lai Air Base destroying two A-4 Skyhawks and damaging a further six. Marines killed 15 of the 20-man VC sapper squad.

30 October
In New York City, 25,000 people marched down Fifth Avenue in support of Johnson and the war. Demonstrations of support took place in other locations in the United States as well. The New York march was sponsored by the New York City Council, the American Legion and the Veterans of Foreign Wars.

Two USAF A-1 Skyraiders mistakenly struck the South Vietnamese village of De Duc near Bong Son in Bình Định Province, killing 48 civilians, mostly women and children and injuring 48 more. The mistake is later attributed to a map reading error by South Vietnamese.

The VC attacked Hill 22 south of the Túy Loan River occupied by Company A, 1st Battalion, 1st Marines partially overrunning the position. Marine reinforcements arrived and drove off the VC killing 57 and capturing one for the loss of 16 Marines killed.

November
 2 November 
Norman Morrison a 31 year old Quaker died of burns suffered when he set himself on fire in front of The Pentagon, in protest against the war. Morrison was holding his one-year-old daughter as he doused himself in kerosene, and was reportedly still holding her as he began to burn, letting the child go after horrified onlookers yelled 'Drop the baby!" The child was rescued, unharmed but Morrison was dead on arrival at the Fort Myer dispensary. Morrison had set himself ablaze  from, and within sight of, the office of Defense Secretary McNamara, who would write 30 years later, "Morrison's death was a tragedy not only for his family, but also for me and the country." North Vietnam would memorialize him with a postage stamp.

 3 November
In a memorandum to President Johnson, Secretary McNamara estimated total communist forces in South Vietnam as having increased to 230,000, including 71,000 VC main force, 40,000 political cadre, 110,000 guerrillas and 20,000 PAVN soldiers. McNamara anticipated that these totals would increase.

4 November
Photojournalist Dickey Chapelle dies from a shrapnel wound caused by a VC booby-trap while on patrol with a Marine platoon during Operation Black Ferret, a search and destroy operation 16 km south of Chu Lai. She became the first female war correspondent to be killed in Vietnam, as well as the first American female reporter to be killed in action.

5 November
Ho Thi Que a 38 year old ARVN Ranger known as "The Tiger Lady of South Vietnam", was killed during an argument with her husband, Major Nguyen Van Dan.

 5–8 November

Operation Hump was a search and destroy operation by the 173rd Airborne Brigade, in War Zone D north of Biên Hòa. 1 RAR deployed south of the Đồng Nai River while the 1st Battalion, 503rd Infantry, conducted a helicopter assault on an LZ northwest of the Đồng Nai and Song Be rivers. The operation resulted in 403 VC, 49 U.S. and two Australians killed.

 8 November  
The Battle of Gang Toi was fought between 1 RAR and the VC. The battle occurred when 1 RAR found a VC bunker system in the Gang Toi Hills, in northern Biên Hòa Province. The battle resulted in six VC killed and five captured and two Australians killed.

The Republic of Korea Army Capital Division completed its landing in South Vietnam to participate in the war. The Capital Division was stationed at Qui Nhơn in Bình Định Province on the central coast of South Vietnam. With the Koreans in Qui Nhơn, a brigade of the U.S. 1st Infantry Division moved inland to protect Highway 19, which led to Pleiku in the Central Highlands. The South Korean 2nd Marine Brigade was stationed at the port city of Nha Trang.

10-18 November
Battalion Landing Team 2nd Battalion, 7th Marines and the 3rd Battalion Vietnamese Marine Corps conducted Operation Blue Marlin which began with an amphibious assault north of Tam Kỳ. The initial results were negligible as the VC had apparently withdrawn two days previously. On 16 November phase 2 of the operation began with 3rd Battalion, 3rd Marines conducting an amphibious assault south of Hội An to link up with ARVN forces. The VC generally avoided contact, but 25 VC were killed and 15 captured for the loss of two ARVN killed.

12 November
In the Battle of Ap Bau Bang two regiments from the VC 9th Division attacked a night defensive position of the United States 2nd Battalion, 2nd Infantry Regiment at Ap Bàu Bàng, 25 km north of Thủ Dầu Một. The battle resulted in 146 VC killed and a further 50 estimated killed and 20 U.S. killed.

Peter Hunting, an American member of the International Voluntary Service, is killed in a VC ambush in the Mekong Delta, becoming the first American civilian volunteer to be killed in the war.

 14–18 November

In the Battle of Ia Drang for the first time, the U.S. Army and PAVN met head-on in a major engagement, with the ARVN playing only a minor role. Casualties were heavy on both sides: in the fighting at LZ X-Ray (14-6 November) the PAVN lost 634 killed and six captured with a further 1,215 estimated killed, for U.S. losses of 79 killed; in the ambush at LZ Albany (17 November) the U.S. lost 151 killed while claiming 403 PAVN killed. For Westmoreland, the battle was a victory for U.S. firepower and mobility in a war of attrition in which the U.S. attempted to kill more communist troops than could be replaced. However, in the words of Joe Galloway, a journalist awarded a Bronze Star for his participation in the battle, Ia Drang was "the battle that convinced Ho Chi Minh he could win." The communists would "grind down the Americans" as they had the French in the 1940s and early '50s in the Indochina War.

14-22 November
Operation Bushmaster was a search and destroy operation conducted by the 3rd Brigade, 1st Infantry Division south of the Michelin Rubber Plantation in Bình Dương Province. The operation resulted in 245 VC killed.

17-9 November
The VC 1st Regiment overran Hiệp Đức District resulting in 174 Regional Force defenders missing and 315 weapons lost. 30 Marine UH-34D helicopters, supported by fixed-wing attack aircraft, lifted 788 ARVN troops to relieve the garrison. Two ARVN battalions killed 141 VC and captured 87 weapons while suffering 33 killed. American advisors with the ARVN estimated that Marine air support had accounted for another 300 VC killed. However the ARVN had to withdraw from the area to counter a VC attack on Thach Tru.

21-4 November
The Rangers had lost 71 killed and two missing while VC losses were 175 killed by U.S. body count and three VC captured. When the Marines landed, they secured the landing zones, occupied night defensive positions and early the next morning cleared the critical terrain, capturing 17 VC and killing three, Marine losses were two killed.

24 November
A U.S. military spokesman reported that 240 American servicemen had been killed in the war during the week of 14–20 November, in the deadliest week of the war for Americans up to that time. During the years 1961–4, there had been 244 U.S. deaths, only slightly more than the casualties for the week. The newest casualties raised the toll to 1,335 dead and 6,131 wounded.

25 November
General Lon Nol, Chief of Staff of the Royal Cambodian Army, concluded an agreement with Luo Ruiqing, the Chief of Staff of China's People's Liberation Army, permitting the passage of PAVN/VC troops through its border regions and allowing China to ship war supplies to Vietnam through Cambodian territory. Lon Nol had traveled to Beijing at the request of Prince Sihanouk.

27 November
The "March on Washington for Peace in Vietnam", organized by the "Committee for a SANE Nuclear Policy" (SANE), attracted a crowd of almost 35,000 demonstrators who picketed the White House, then moved on toward the Washington Monument. It was the largest public protest against U.S. involvement in Vietnam up to that time. The leaders of SANE were concerned about the public perception of the antiwar movement, so they asked that protesters only carry signs with "authorized slogans", and not to demand immediate withdrawal, nor to burn the American flag.

In an act which it said was being done as a "response to the friendly sentiments of the American people against the war in South Vietnam", the VC released U.S. Army Sergeant George E. Smith and Specialist E-5 Claude E. McClure, who had both been captured on 24 November 1963. Vietnam Communist Party official Le Duc Tho escorted Smith and McClure across the border from North Vietnam into Cambodia, freeing both men after two years as prisoners of war. Smith and McClure would travel across neutral Cambodia on their own and would address a press conference in Phnom Penh on 30 November, praising their captors and American antiwar protesters, and criticizing the war effort. On 27 December the U.S. military announced that Smith and McClure would face court martial for aiding the enemy.

PAVN forces attacked the ARVN 7th Regiment, 5th Division in the Michelin Rubber Plantation killing most of the Regiment and five U.S. advisers.

28 November
In response to President Johnson's call for "more flags" in South Vietnam, Philippines President-elect Ferdinand Marcos announced that he would send troops to help fight in South Vietnam.

 30 November 
After meeting with General Westmoreland in South Vietnam, Secretary of Defense McNamara recommended in a memorandum to President Johnson that the number of U.S. troops in South Vietnam should be increased to about 400,000 in 1966 and possibly by an additional 200,000 in 1967. McNamara estimated that 1,000 Americans per month would die in the war and that "the odds are even" that the U.S. would prevail. McNamara recommended a pause in bombing North Vietnam of 3 to 4 weeks duration to try to find a way to end the war before undertaking the military buildup. Ambassador Lodge, General Westmoreland, and CINCPAC opposed the bombing halt.

December
In an article in Reader's Digest, former Vice President Nixon opposed negotiations to end the war. "There can be no substitute for victory when the objective is the defeat of communist aggression", he said.
1-6 December
Operation Bushmaster II was conducted by the U.S. 3rd Brigade, 1st Infantry Division in the Michelin Rubber Plantation. The operation resulted in 318 VC killed and 27 captured and 44 U.S. killed and three missing.

3 December
A U.S. Marine at Da Nang allegedly vandalized the Khue Bac Pagoda by beheading the shrine's golden image of Gautama Buddha. By 8 December 500 Buddhist protesters marched through the streets of Da Nang after Khue Bac's principal monk, Thich Giac Ngo, threatened to disembowel himself to atone for allowing the Buddha to be destroyed.  U.S. Ambassador Lodge promised to fully investigate the incident and to compensate the monastery for the damage.

4 December
The VC bombed the Metropole Bachelor Enlisted Quarters in Saigon killing seven Vietnamese civilians, one U.S. Marine and one New Zealand soldier and injuring 175 others. The VC claim to have killed 200 Americans.

5 December

5-7 December

5 December - 11 November 1968
Operation Tiger Hound was a covert USAF 2nd Air Division, later Seventh Air Force and U.S. Navy Task Force 77 aerial interdiction campaign conducted in southeastern Laos.

8-20 December

Operation Harvest Moon/Lien Ket 18 was a U.S. 1st Marine Division and ARVN 2nd Division search and destroy operation in the Quế Sơn Valley in western Quảng Tín Province. The operation resulted in 407 VC killed and 33 captured and 45 Marines killed and 90 ARVN killed and 91 missing.

10 December
A report in the New York Times indicated that bombing of North Vietnam was having little impact on the war.

Senator Gruening again criticized U.S. involvement in Vietnam stating that the U.S. had made no commitment to defend South Vietnam, contrary to Johnson's claims that previous administrations had pledged to defend it. He described the conflict as a civil war that was irrelevant to U.S. security interests.

11 December
A USAF C-123 Provider transport plane crashed with 81 ARVN Airborne and four American officers on board. There were no survivors and the wreckage wasn't located until 23 December.

12 December
Two VC platoons killed 23 South Vietnamese canal construction workers asleep in a Buddhist Pagoda in Tan Huong, Dinh Tuong Province, seven others were wounded.

15 December
USAF planes destroy the Uông Bí thermal power plant which provided approximately 15% of North Vietnam's power.

16-21 December
150-200 VC supported by mortars attacked an 81-strong Marine Reconnaissance, Special Forces, CIDG and Nung force on a hilltop position in Ba Tơ District. The defenders were forced to disperse and evade losing three Marines, one Special Forces and 10 CIDG killed.

 18 December 
Operation Game Warden (Task Force 116) began. It was a U.S. Navy and Republic of Vietnam Navy operation in the Mekong Delta to patrol the rivers and coastal waters, prevent the infiltration of soldiers and supplies from North Vietnam and deny the VC access to the waterways.

After a visit to South Vietnam, Marine Corps General Victor Krulak wrote a report expressing disagreement with General Westmoreland's strategy of attrition. It was "wasteful of American lives, promising a protracted, strength-sapping battle with small likelihood of a successful outcome." Krulak proposed instead a focus on a pacification program to provide village security plus increased air strikes.

For the first time since the beginning of the war, Saigon came under a VC mortar attack.

 22 December
Second lieutenant Henry Howe jr. was convicted by a court martial of breaching Article 88 of the Uniform Code of Military Justice for attending an antiwar protest in El Paso on 6 November in civilian clothes carrying a sign reading "Let's have more than a choice between petty ignorant facists in 1968" and "End Johnson's facist aggression in Vietnam". He was sentenced to dismissal from the service, forfeiture of all pay and two years of hard labor. The sentence was later reduced to confinement for one year.

 24 December
President Johnson announced a halt in the bombing of North Vietnam and initiated a worldwide diplomatic effort to persuade North Vietnam to negotiate an end to the war.  The Department of Defense opposed the bombing halt.

 27 December
Ho Chi Minh addressed the Communist Party Central Committee in Hanoi. Ho said that "politics" was the weak point of the American and South Vietnamese enemy, and the domestic situation of the United States will not permit the U.S. to utilize its military and economic power in South Vietnam.  The Committee decided that the communist forces in South Vietnam should seek a "decisive victory within a relatively short period of time", but must prepare to defend itself if the U.S. expands its war effort.

 30 December
VC assassinated Tu Chung, editor of the Chính Luận (Political Discussion) newspaper outside his home in Saigon.

 31 December
U.S. military personnel in South Vietnam now totaled 184,314, compared to 23,310 a year earlier. U.S. casualties in 1965 totaled 1,928 dead, compared to 216 in the 1964. North Vietnam claimed to have shot down 834 U.S. aircraft during the year. South Vietnamese military forces totaled 514,000, including the ARVN and the Regional and Popular Force militias. The South Vietnamese armed forces suffered 11,242 killed in action, a five-fold increase in battle deaths since 1960. 93,000 persons deserted from the South Vietnam's armed forces in 1965.

At year's end, the PAVN numbered 400,000, compared to 195,000 a year earlier. VPAF and air defense capabilities were greatly expanded. 50,000 PAVN cadre and soldiers infiltrated South Vietnam during 1965, equal to the total number infiltrated from 1959 through 1964. Group 559, charged with transporting supplies down the Ho Chi Minh Trail to supply PAVN/VC troops in both South Vietnam and Laos, was expanded to 24,400 personnel and moved almost as much tonnage south in 1965 as it had in the preceding six years.

Conscription into the United States armed forces in 1965 was 230,991 men, compared to 112,386 in 1964.

Year in numbers

References

Sources

 FRUS. Foreign Relations of the United States, 1964–1968, Vol II, Vietnam, January–June 1965, United States Department of State,  http://history.state.gov/historicaldocuments/frus1964-68v02
 FRUS Foreign Relations of the United States, 1964–1968, Vol III, Vietnam, June–December 1965, United States Department of State,  http://history.state.gov/historicaldocuments/frus1964-68v03
 - Total pages: 413 

Vietnam War by year
War
Vietnam
United States history timelines